Bitmessage is a decentralized, encrypted, peer-to-peer, trustless communications protocol that can be used by one person to send encrypted messages to another person, or to multiple subscribers.

Bitmessage was conceived by software developer Jonathan Warren, who based its design on the decentralized digital currency, Bitcoin. The software was released in November 2012 under the MIT license.

Bitmessage gained a reputation for being out of reach of warrantless wiretapping conducted by the National Security Agency (NSA), due to the decentralized nature of the protocol, and its encryption being difficult to crack. As a result, downloads of the Bitmessage program increased fivefold during June 2013, after news broke of classified email surveillance activities conducted by the NSA.

Bitmessage has also been mentioned as an experimental alternative to email by Popular Science and CNET.

Some ransomware programs instruct affected users to use Bitmessage to communicate with the attackers.

PyBitmessage version 0.6.2 (March 1, 2017) had a remote code execution vulnerability. It was fixed in version 0.6.3 (February 13, 2018).

References

Further reading
 Bitmessage: A Peer‐to‐Peer Message Authentication and Delivery System (Jonathan Warren) - Bitmessage white paper

External links
 

Cryptographic software
Free software programmed in Python
Email authentication
Internet privacy software
Open standards
Peer-to-peer software
Software using the MIT license
Tor onion services